Hari Gidwani (born 23 October 1953) is an Indian former first-class cricketer and selector. He played over 100 first-class matches mainly representing Delhi and Bihar.

Career
Gidwani played as a right-handed middle-order batsman, known to be "a dashing stroke player". He appeared in 119 first-class matches in a career spanning 20 seasons from 1972/73 to 1991/92 and scored more than 6000 runs. He started his career with his home team Delhi, but switched to Bihar in 1978/79. He top-scored with 100 and 48 against the visiting Sri Lankan team in 1975/76, but did not gain Indian team selection. Gidwani scored centuries in five Ranji Trophy matches in succession during 1986–87 Ranji Trophy and 1987–88 Ranji Trophy. His highest score of 229 came against Karnataka in the 1989–90 Ranji Trophy pre-quarterfinal in which he was also the captain.

After retiring, Gidwani became a junior team selector. He worked as a member of the Delhi selection panel since the 1990s, a position he holds as of October 2015.

Personal life
Gidwani studied at the Hindu College, University of Delhi. He owns a sweet store in Old Delhi.

References

External links 
 
 

1953 births
Living people
Indian cricketers
Delhi cricketers
Bihar cricketers
North Zone cricketers
East Zone cricketers